Mottola is an Italian language surname. Möttölä is a Finnish language surname. Notable people with the surnames Mottola or Möttölä include:
 Chad Mottola (born 1971), American baseball player and coach
 Greg Mottola (born 1964), American film director and screenwriter
 Hanno Möttölä (born 1976), Finnish basketball player
 Stefano Mottola, Italian astronomer
 Tommy Mottola (born 1949), music executive and co-owner of Casablanca Records
 Tony Mottola (1918–2004), American guitarist

Finnish-language surnames
Italian-language surnames